Alexandra Navrotsky (born 20 June 1943 in New York City) is a physical chemist in the field of nanogeoscience.  She is an elected member of the United States National Academy of Sciences (NAS) and the American Philosophical Society (APS). She was a board member of the Earth Sciences and Resources division of the NAS from 1995 until 2000.
In 2005, she was awarded the Urey Medal, by the European Association of Geochemistry.
In 2006, she was awarded the Harry H. Hess Medal, by the American Geophysical Union.
She is currently the director of NEAT ORU (Nanomaterials in Environment, Agriculture, and Technology Organized Research Unit), a primary program in nanogeoscience.  She is Distinguished Professor at University of California, Davis.

Early life and education
She graduated from Bronx High School of Science in New York. She received B.S. (1963), M.S. (1964), and Ph.D. (1967) in physical chemistry from University of Chicago, where she studied with Ole J. Kleppa.

Career and research
In 1967, she went to Germany at the Clausthal University of Technology for postdoctoral work with Hermann Schmalzried. She came back to the U.S. in 1968 and continued her postdoctoral work at Pennsylvania State University. Then she joined the Chemistry faculty at Arizona State University, for approximately five consecutive years. Later on, she moved to the Department of Geological and Geophysical Sciences at Princeton University in 1985. She became the chair of that department from 1988 to 1991. In 1997, she moved to University of California at Davis and became an Interdisciplinary Professor of Ceramic, Earth, and Environmental Materials Chemistry. In 2001, she was chosen as the Edward Roessler Chair in Mathematical and Physical Sciences. As of 2013, she was appointed interim dean of Mathematical and Physical Sciences in the College of Letters and Sciences, at University of California at Davis.  Her specializations include: Solid-state chemistry, Ceramics, Physics and Chemistry of Minerals, Geochemistry.

Geochemistry
Since 1997, she has built a unique high temperature calorimetry facility. She has also designed and enhanced the instrumentation.  Navrotsky introduced and applied the method for measuring the energetics of crystalline oxides of glasses, amorphous, nanophase material, porous materials of hydrous phases and carbonates also more recently nitrides and oxynitrides. Obtaining the thermo chemical data is used to understand the compatibility and reactivity of materials in technological and geological application. The energetics provides insight into chemical bonding, order-disorder reactions, and phase transitions.
Navrotsky's calorimetry has also been used in providing thermo chemical data for a variety of perovskite-related phases which has major consequences for convection and evolution on a planetary scale.
One of Navrotsky's works has shown that many zeolitic and mesoporous phases have energies only slightly higher than those of their stable dense polymorphs. The energy is associated with the presence or absence of strained bond angles not with the density.

Nanomaterials
Her research is mainly focused on the structure and the stability of both natural and synthetic nanomaterials along with their dependence of temperature and pressure. She is also looking into the application of nanomaterials in geochemical pollutant transport in the air as it relates to the global climate change.

Awards and honors
Alfred P. Sloan Fellow (1973)
Mineralogical Society of America Award and Fellow (1981)
American Geophysical Union Fellow (1988)
Member, National Academy of Sciences (1993)
President, Mineralogical Society of America (1992–1993)
Honorary doctorate from the Faculty of Science and Technology at Uppsala University, Sweden (1995)
Ross Coffin Purdy Award, American Ceramic Society Fellow (1995)
Geochemical Society Fellow (1997)
Alexander M. Cruickshank Award, Gordon Research Conference (2000)
Hugh Huffman Memorial Award, The Calorimetry Conference (2000)
Ceramic Educational Council Outstanding Educator Award (2000)
American Ceramic Society Fellow (2001)
American Ceramic Society, Best Paper Award of the Nuclear and Environmental Technology Division (2001)
Benjamin Franklin Medal in Earth Science (2002)
Highly Cited Researchers Award, ISI Thomson Scientific (2002)
Fellow, The Mineralogical Society (Great Britain) (2004)
Urey Medal, European Association of Geochemistry (EAG) (2005)
Spriggs Phase Equilibria Award, American Ceramic Society (ACerS)(2005)
Rossini Award, International Association of Chemical Thermodynamics (IACT)(2006)
Harry H. Hess Medal, American Geophysical Union (AGU)(2006)
Roebling Medal, Mineralogical Society of America (2009)

Publications

References

External links
Alexandra Navrotsky's Web Site
"Nanotechnology in San Francisco Bay Area: Dawn of New Age"
NEAT (Nanomaterials in the Environment, Agriculture, and Technology)

Living people
University of Chicago alumni
University of California, Davis faculty
Members of the United States National Academy of Sciences
21st-century American chemists
Fellows of the American Geophysical Union
American women chemists
Santa Fe Institute people
American women geologists
1943 births
Fellows of the American Ceramic Society
Arizona State University faculty
Inorganic chemists
Princeton University faculty
Solid state chemists
21st-century American women scientists
Recipients of the V. M. Goldschmidt Award